Blue Ribbon BBQ is a family-owned chain of barbecue restaurants in the Greater Boston area.  The restaurants offer an assortment of authentic regional southern wood-smoked barbecue.

Locations 
Blue Ribbon has restaurant locations at 1375 Washington Street in West Newton, 908 Massachusetts Avenue in Arlington, and 342 Washington Street in Dedham.  Their business office, catering office and central kitchen are located in Newton Highlands. In January 2022, it was announced that Blue Ribbon Barbeque was expanding to several new states, including South Carolina, Texas, Georgia, and Ohio. The restaurant will share space with Buc-ee’s Travel Stops. Blue Ribbon BBQ is also opening a location at DFW Airport in Terminal B.

Awards 
Boston Magazine awarded Blue Ribbon Barbecue Best of Boston in 1999, 2006, 2007, 2008 and 2011.
Phantom Gourmet awarded Blue Ribbon The Greatest: BBQ Sandwiches. Citysearch awarded them Best of Citysearch in 2006 and 2007.

Groupon 
On October 14, 2010, Blue Ribbon BBQ set a national restaurant record for most sales on the deal-of-the-day website, Groupon. The chain sold 16,751 deals, resulting in mentions on the cover story of The New York Times Business Day and the Harvard Business Review.

See also
 List of barbecue restaurants

References 

Companies based in Middlesex County, Massachusetts
Barbecue restaurants in the United States
Buildings and structures in Arlington, Massachusetts
Buildings and structures in Dedham, Massachusetts
Buildings and structures in Newton, Massachusetts
Restaurant chains in the United States
Restaurants in Massachusetts